Smadar Naoz (סמדר נאוז, born 1978) is an Israeli-American astrophysicist, and was the 2015 winner of the Annie Jump Cannon Award in Astronomy for her scientific contributions to the fields of cosmology and planetary dynamics.

Early life and education 
Naoz grew up in Jerusalem Israel, and developed her love for astrophysics at a young age with her mother regularly watching Star Trek: The Original Series with her and her younger sister. She graduated from the Racah Institute at The Hebrew University with her Bachelors of Science (2002) and her Masters in Science (2004), before continuing her education at the Tel Aviv University, where she was awarded her PhD in 2010. The subject of her PhD research was the first generation of galaxies.

Career
After obtaining her PhD, Naoz accepted an IAU Gruber postdoctoral fellowship at Northwestern University's Center for Interdisciplinary Exploration and Research in Astrophysics (CIERA). After her tenure as an IAU Gruber postdoc, she became an Einstein Fellow at the Institute for Theory and Computation at the Center for Astrophysics  Harvard & Smithsonian in Cambridge, Massachusetts.

Naoz is continuing her research, and working as an assistant professor at the Department of Physics and Astronomy at the University of California, Los Angeles.

Contributions
Naoz's contributions to the field of astrophysics are varied, as her research interests are not strictly localized. She started her career investigating the formation of the first generation of galaxies following the creation of the universe, contributing to cosmology by trying to piece together early structure formation.

Naoz has been probing the dynamical evolution of Hot Jupiters. She has published many papers in leading scientific journals, including a paper about Hot Jupiters interactions, in the science journal Nature.

Awards
 Fellow of the American Physical Society, 2022
 Annie Jump Cannon Prize awarded by the American Astronomical Society, 2015
 Einstein Fellowship awarded by NASA, Sept. 2012
 The National Postdoctoral Award Program for Advancing Women in Science, awarded by Weizmann Institute of Science, 2009-2011
 Dan David Prize 2009 scholarship recipient in the field of "Astrophysics – History of the Universe"
 The Peter and Patricia Gruber Foundation Fellowship in 2010.
 School of Physics and Astronomy Award for Outstanding Achievements, awarded by Tel Aviv University, 2006

References

External links
 Smadar Naoz website at Department of Physics & Astronomy, Division of Astronomy and Astrophysics, UCLA
 
 Post formation Dynamical Evolution of Exoplanet Systems — Smadar Naoz (UCLA) 2015, lecture given at the Sagan Exoplanet Summer Workshop 
 Smadar Naoz , "Gas in the First Generation of Galaxies", Hydrogen Cosmology Workshop", held May 18–20, 2011 at The Institute for Theoretical, Atomic and Molecular and Optical Physics, Center for Astrophysics  Harvard & Smithsonian, Cambridge, Massachusetts

Living people
Israeli physicists
Women astrophysicists
Hebrew University of Jerusalem alumni
Tel Aviv University alumni
University of California, Los Angeles faculty
Recipients of the Annie J. Cannon Award in Astronomy
Fellows of the American Physical Society
1978 births